A pink triangle has been a symbol for the LGBT community, initially intended as a badge of shame, but later reclaimed as a positive symbol of self-identity and love for queerness. In Nazi Germany in the 1930s and 1940s, it began as one of the Nazi concentration camp badges, distinguishing those imprisoned because they had been identified by authorities as gay men. In the 1970s, it was revived as a symbol of protest against homophobia and transphobia, and has since been adopted by the larger LGBT community as a popular symbol of LGBT pride and the LGBT movements and queer liberation movements.

History

Nazi prisoner identification 

In Nazi concentration camps, each prisoner was required to wear a downward-pointing, equilateral triangular cloth badge on their chest, the color of which identified the stated reason for their imprisonment.

Later, the use of a pink triangle was established for prisoners identified as homosexual men, which also included bisexual men and transgender women. (Lesbian and bisexual women and trans men were not systematically imprisoned; some were classified as "asocial", wearing a black triangle.) The pink triangle was also assigned to others considered sexual deviants, including zoophiles and pedophiles in addition to sex offenders. If a prisoner was also identified as Jewish, the triangle was superimposed over a second yellow triangle pointing the opposite way, to resemble the Star of David like the yellow badge identifying other Jews. Prisoners wearing a pink triangle were harshly treated by most other prisoners.

After the camps were liberated at the end of the Second World War, some of the prisoners imprisoned for homosexuality were re-incarcerated by the Allied-established Federal Republic of Germany, as the Nazi laws against homosexuality were not repealed there until 1969. An out homosexual man named Heinz Dörmer, for instance, served in a Nazi concentration camp and then in the jails of the new Republic. The Nazi amendments to Paragraph 175, which turned homosexuality, previously labeled as a minor offense, into a felony, remained intact in East Germany until 1968 and in West Germany until 1969. West Germany continued to imprison those identified as homosexual until 1994 under a revised version of the Paragraph, which still made sex between men up to the age of 21—as well as queer male sex work—illegal. While many, though not all, lawsuits seeking monetary compensation have failed, in 2002 the German government issued an official apology to gay men who were persecuted during the war.

Rudolf Brazda, one of the last known homosexual concentration camp survivors, died on August 3, 2011 at the age of 98.

Symbol of homosexual liberation 

In the 1970s, newly active Australian, European and North American queer liberation advocates began to use the pink triangle to raise awareness of its use in Nazi Germany. In 1972, gay concentration camp survivor Heinz Heger's memoir  (The Men with the Pink Triangle) brought it to greater public attention. In response, the German gay liberation group  issued a call in 1973 for gay men to wear it as a memorial to past victims and to protest continuing discrimination. In the 1975 movie The Rocky Horror Picture Show, Dr. Frank N. Furter—a bisexual transvestite—wears a pink triangle badge on one of his outfits. In 1976, Peter Recht, Detlef Stoffel, and Christiane Schmerl made the German documentary  (Pink Triangle? That was such a long time ago...). Publications such as San Francisco's Gay Sunshine and Toronto's The Body Politic promoted the pink triangle as a memorial to those who had faced persecution and oppression.

In the 1980s, the pink triangle was increasingly used not just as a memorial but as a positive symbol of both self-identity and community identity. It commonly represented both gay and lesbian identity, and was incorporated into the logos of such organizations and businesses. It was also used by individuals, sometimes discreetly or ambiguously as an "insider" code unfamiliar to the heterosexual majority. The logo for the 1987 March on Washington for Lesbian and Gay Rights was a silhouette of the US Capitol Dome superimposed over a pink triangle.

Taking a more militant tone, the AIDS Coalition To Unleash Power (ACT UP) was formed by six gay activists in New York City in 1987, and to draw attention to the disease's disproportionate impact on gay and m-spec men, and the apparent role of "genocidal" queer-antagonism in slowing progress on medical research, adopted an upward-pointing pink triangle on a black field along with the slogan "SILENCE = DEATH" as its logo. Some use the triangle in this orientation as a specific "reversal" of its usage by the Nazis. The Pink Panthers Movement in Denver, Colorado adopted a pink triangle with clawed panther print logo, adapted from the original Pink Panthers Patrol in New York City.

In the 1990s, a pink triangle enclosed in a green circle came to be commonly used as a symbol identifying "safe spaces" for LGBTQ+ people at work or in school.

The pink triangle served as the basis for the "biangles", a symbol of bisexual identity which consists of pink and blue triangles overlapping in a lavender or purple area. The pink and blue symbolize either homosexuality and attraction to people of other a/genders (which can still be queer desire) reflecting some bisexuals' and biromantics' attraction to both the same a/gender(s) and other a/genders.

Use of the pink triangle symbol is not without criticism. In 1993, historian Klaus Müller argued that "the pink triangles of the concentration camps became an international symbol of gay and lesbian pride because so few of us are haunted by concrete memories of those who were forced to wear them."

Memorials 
The symbol of the pink triangle has been included in numerous public monuments and memorials. In 1980 a jury chose the pink triangle design for the Homomonument in Amsterdam, to memorialize gay and m-spec men killed in the Holocaust (and also victims of anti-gay violence generally). In 1995, after a decade of campaigning for it, a pink triangle plaque was installed at the Dachau Memorial Museum to commemorate the suffering of gay men and lesbians. In 2015 a pink triangle was incorporated into Chicago's Legacy Walk. It is the basis of the design of the Gay and Lesbian Holocaust Memorial in Sydney. In 2001 it inspired both San Francisco's Pink Triangle Park in the Castro and the  Pink Triangle on Twin Peaks that is displayed every year during the Pride weekend. It is also the basis for LGBTQ+ memorials in Barcelona, Sitges, and Montevideo, and the burial component of the LGBTQ+ Pink Dolphin Monument in Galveston.

References

Further reading

Persecution of homosexuals in Nazi Germany
LGBT symbols
Terminology of Nazi concentration camps
Triangle, pink
Triangles